Vien (וויען) is a Rabbinical hasidic dynasty originating in present-day Vienna. The previous rav of Vien was Rav Chaim Z. Hersh Zegelbaum of Brooklyn, New York. He was a descendant of Rav Menachem Mendel Stern (1759–1834) of Sighet, author of Derech Emunah.

Lineage
Rabbi Yoseph Yisroel Zegelbaum (born 1915 in Hungary; died June 4, 1989 in Brooklyn); son of Rabbi Yaakov Dovid Zegelbaum. Rabbi Yoseph Yisroel was married to Rebbetzin Mindel; daughter of Rabbi Yoseph Menachem Friedman of Makova (a brother of Rabbi Yisroel Chaim Friedman (1852–1922) author of Likutei Mariach). She died in Vienna in March 1945.
Rabbi Chaim Zvi Hersh Zegelbaum of Brooklyn (died July 6, 2017, 11 Tammuz 5777 A.M., in Brooklyn, at the age of 77); (eldest son of Rabbi Yoseph Yisroel); married to Rebbetzin Sarah, daughter of Rabbi Kalman Yehuda of Bnei Brak.
Rabbi Nussen Zegelbaum (eldest son of Rabbi Chaim Z. Hersh); married to Rebbetzin Shprintza Mirl, daughter of Rabbi Peretz, Av Beit Din of Sulitza.
Rebbetzin Chana; daughter of Rabbi Nussen Zegelbaum.
Rebbetzin Rivka Meisels; daughter of Rabbi Nussen Zegelbaum and wife of Rabbi Shlomo Yechezkel Meisels, grandson of Rabbi Nusen Yosef Meisels.
Rabbi Yoseph Yisroel Zegelbaum.
Rabbi Yakov Duvid Zegelbaum of Brooklyn. son of Rabbi Chaim Z. Hersh and son-in-law of the Spinka Rebbe.
Rebbetzin Mindl Sheva; daughter of Rabbi Chaim Zvi Hersh Zegelbaum.
Rabbi Menachem Ben-Zion Zegelbaum; son of Rabbi Chaim Zvi Hersh Zegelbaum.
Rebbetzin Sheindel Malkah; daughter of Rabbi Chaim Zvi Hersh Zegelbaum.
Rabbi Meir Zegelbaum; son of Rabbi Chaim Zvi Hersh Zegelbaum.
Rabbi Shmiel Teitelbaum of Brooklyn; son of Rabbi Aharon Teitelbaum and son-in-law of Rabbi Yoseph Yisroel Zegelbaum.
Rabbi Yakov Duvid Ben-Zion Teitelbaum of Brooklyn; son of Rabbi Shmiel and son-in-law of Rabbi Yosef Chaim Moskowitz of Brooklyn, grandson of Rabbi Shulem Moshkovitz of Shotz.
Rabbi Aryeh Leibish Teitelbaum of Brooklyn; son of Rabbi Shmiel and son-in-law of Rabbi Yitzchok Luzer Moskowitz of Monsey, New York, grandson of Rabbi Shulem Moshkovitz of Shotz.
Rabbi Moshe Pollak of Brooklyn; son of the Rabbi of Landsberg and son-in-law of Rabbi Yoseph Yisroel Zegelbaum.
Rabbi Chananya Yom Tov Lipa Zegelbaum of Brooklyn; son of Rabbi Yoseph Yisroel and son-in-law of Rabbi Raphael Silber, author of Marpe Lanefesh.
Rabbi Yaakov Dovid Zegelbaum; son of Rabbi Chananya Yom Tov Lipa.
Rabbi Yaakov Dovid Ben-Zion Zegelbaum; son of Rabbi Yoseph Yisroel.

References

Ashkenazi Jewish culture in Austria
Austrian-Jewish culture in the United States
Hasidic dynasties
Hasidic Judaism in New York City
Jews and Judaism in Vienna
Orthodox Judaism in Austria
Rabbinic dynasties